Mark Lawton Doumit (November 26, 1961 – June 21, 2021) was an American commercial fisherman and politician who represented the 19th District in the Washington State Senate and the State House from 1997-2006.

Political career
Doumit was elected as a Wahkiakum County Commissioner in 1988. He served two terms as a Commissioner before running for the Washington House of Representatives in 1996.

In the House, Doumit chaired the House Natural Resources Committee.

Doumit was appointed to the Senate in 2002 to fill the term of Sid Snyder. He vacated his seat to take a job in the private sector in late 2006.

References

1961 births
2021 deaths
Place of birth missing
Democratic Party Washington (state) state senators
Democratic Party members of the Washington House of Representatives
Washington State University alumni
People from Cathlamet, Washington